Edgar Salis (born May 20, 1970) is a former Swiss professional ice hockey defenceman. He most recently played for ZSC Lions of the National League A. In 2002, he played for the Switzerland national ice hockey team in the Olympic Games in Salt Lake City, Utah.

Career statistics

Regular season and playoffs

International

External links

1970 births
Living people
HC Ambrì-Piotta players
EHC Arosa players
SC Bern players
ECH Chur players
SC Rapperswil-Jona Lakers players
Swiss ice hockey defencemen
ZSC Lions players
Ice hockey players at the 2002 Winter Olympics
Olympic ice hockey players of Switzerland
People from Chur
Sportspeople from Graubünden